Tudor Cristian Băluță (born 27 March 1999) is a Romanian professional footballer who plays as a defensive midfielder or a centre-back for Liga I club Farul Constanța.

Club career

Viitorul Constanța
Băluță began his career in native Craiova, joining the Gheorghe Popescu Football School at age 8. Six years later, he moved to Viitorul Constanța's academy. Băluță made his professional debut in the Liga I on 2 May 2016, aged 17, replacing Ianis Hagi in the 54th minute of a 6–1 thrashing of ASA Târgu Mureș.

He did not feature in any senior games in the next season as Viitorul won the first league title in its history, but started appearing frequently for the side since the summer of 2017. On 24 August that year, Băluță recorded his European debut in a UEFA Europa League play-off round 0–4 loss to Red Bull Salzburg. On 30 August 2018, he scored his first goal—and the only of the match—in a league win over Astra Giurgiu.

Brighton & Hove Albion
Băluță agreed to a three-and-a-half-year contract with English club Brighton & Hove Albion on 31 January 2019. Băluță was immediately loaned back to Viitorul Constanța for the remainder of the campaign. Press reported the transfer fee at €3 million, which made him the club's most expensive sale at the time, tied with Florinel Coman.

On 25 May, he was a starter and played the full match in the Cupa României final 2–1 success against Astra Giurgiu.

Returning to Brighton during pre-season following the expiration of his loan, Băluță made the bench for the first time for the Seagulls in a 2–1 away win over Bristol Rovers in the EFL Cup on 27 August 2019 and was named on the bench in a Premier League fixture for the first time in a 1–1 home draw against Burnley on 14 September. He remained an unused substitute in both fixtures. Băluță made his debut for the Sussex club in the EFL Cup playing the whole match in the 3–1 home defeat to Aston Villa on 25 September.

ADO Den Haag (loan)

On 17 January 2020 it was confirmed that Băluță had joined ADO Den Haag on loan until the end of the season. He made his debut for the Eredivisie side a week later playing the full match in a 4–0 away loss at FC Utrecht. Băluță made 4 appearances for The Hague based side with his time at the club cut short due to the Dutch FA taking the decision to cancel the season due to COVID-19.

Dynamo Kyiv (loan)
On 4 October 2020 the loan of Băluță to Dynamo Kyiv was confirmed by the president of the club Ihor Surkis in his interview. He made his debut for Kiev in what was also his first Champions League appearance coming on as a substitute in a 2–2 away draw against Hungarian side Ferencváros on 28 October. Băluță made his Ukrainian Premier League debut coming on as a substitute in a 2–0 away victory against Inhulets on 21 November.

International career
Băluță earned his first senior cap for Romania on 31 May 2018, entering as a 71st-minute substitute for former Viitorul Constanța teammate Dragoș Nedelcu in a 3–2 friendly victory against Chile.

Despite not playing in the qualification phase, he was selected in Romania's squad for the 2019 UEFA European Under-21 Championship in Italy. Băluță scored on his debut against Croatia on 19 June that year, which ended in a 4–1 win for his side. He recorded three more games as Tricolorii mici were eliminated by Germany in the semi-finals, following a 2–4 defeat.

Style of play
Băluță is deployed primarily as a defensive midfielder, but started out as a central defender. He has been likened to former Romanian international and Barcelona captain Gheorghe Popescu, also a native of Dolj County, who in his turn described Băluță as an "intelligent player" with "exceptional qualities".

Career statistics

International

Honours
Viitorul Constanța
Liga I: 2016–17
Cupa României: 2018–19
Supercupa României runner-up: 2017

Dynamo Kyiv
Ukrainian Premier League: 2020–21
Ukrainian Cup: 2020–21

References

External links

1999 births
Living people
Sportspeople from Craiova
Romanian footballers
Association football defenders
Association football midfielders
Liga I players
FC Viitorul Constanța players
Premier League players
Ukrainian Premier League players
Brighton & Hove Albion F.C. players
ADO Den Haag players
FC Dynamo Kyiv players
FCV Farul Constanța players
Romania youth international footballers
Romania international footballers
Olympic footballers of Romania
Footballers at the 2020 Summer Olympics
Romanian expatriate footballers
Expatriate footballers in England
Romanian expatriate sportspeople in England
Expatriate footballers in the Netherlands
Romanian expatriate sportspeople in the Netherlands
Expatriate footballers in Ukraine
Romanian expatriate sportspeople in Ukraine